| tries = {{#expr:
 + 5 + 6 + 5 + 6 + 2 + 4
 + 3 + 10 + 6 + 9 + 6 + 1
 + 4 + 6 + 6 + 7 + 3 + 7
 + 5 + 6 + 5 + 4
 + 7 + 6 + 3 + 6
 + 11 + 3 + 4 + 3 + 7 
 + 7 + 5 + 6 + 5 + 7 + 8
 + 2 + 5 + 5 + 8 + 9 + 2
 + 5 + 6 + 7 + 4 + 3
 + 2 + 5 + 4 + 3 + 8
 + 6 + 2 + 6 + 2 + 5 + 5
 + 7 + 4 + 7 + 5 + 6 + 7
 + 6 + 5 + 9 + 3 + 5 + 4
 + 4 + 11 + 12 + 12 + 6 + 7
 + 6 + 8 + 9 + 11 + 3 + 5
 + 10 + 8 + 6 + 12 + 5 + 4
 + 5 + 5 + 8 + 5 + 9 + 9
 + 3 + 5 + 7 + 11 + 9 + 12
 + 6 + 3 + 9 + 3 + 6 + 7
 + 8 + 5 + 10 + 4 + 6 + 12
 + 9 + 6 + 6 + 11 + 7
 + 8 + 5 + 12 + 9
 + 12 + 8
 + 11
}}
| top point scorer = Marcus Smith (Harlequins)(286 points)
| top try scorer = Sam Simmonds (Exeter)(21 tries)
| website    = www.premiershiprugby.com
| prevseason = 2019–20
| nextseason = 2021–22
}}

The 2020–21 Gallagher Premiership was the 34th season of the top flight English domestic rugby union competition and the third one to be sponsored by Gallagher. The reigning champions entering the season were Exeter Chiefs, who had claimed their second title after defeating Wasps in the 2020 final. Newcastle Falcons had been promoted as champions from the 2019–20 RFU Championship at the first attempt.

The competition was broadcast by BT Sport for the eighth successive season and with five games also simulcast free-to-air on Channel 5. Highlights of each weekend's games were shown on Channel 5 for  the final time, with extended highlights on BT Sport.

Summary
Harlequins won their second title after defeating Exeter Chiefs in the final at Twickenham after having finished fourth in the regular season table. No team was relegated this season after a moratorium was agreed.

Due to changes to the global rugby calendar implemented this year and the COVID-19 pandemic prolonging the 2019–20 Premiership Rugby season, this edition featured a later start and later finish and would take place over a reduced timeframe of 32 weeks.

The season also featured a two-week break in January due to the suspension of both of the European Professional Club Rugby competitions.

Rule changes
New regulations were introduced this season for games cancelled as a result of the pandemic or otherwise. A brief outline of the new regulations are:

 All fixtures will be treated equally.
 No round 1 - 22 fixtures will be postponed unless within the same weekend.
When cancellation is as a result of COVID-19 points will be awarded as follows.
 2 points awarded to the team responsible for cancellation.
 4 points will be awarded to the team who wasn't responsible.
 The match result will be deemed to be 0–0

There are also changes to the regulations allowing the Testing Oversight Group to cancel matches.

Regulations for the semi-finals and final will be published later in the year.

This season also includes a moratorium on relegation due to the effects of the pandemic.

This season is the last under the current regulations before changes are made next season and again before 2024–25.

Teams
Twelve teams compete in the league – the top eleven teams from the previous season and Newcastle Falcons who were promoted from the 2019–20 RFU Championship after a top flight absence of one year. They replaced Saracens who were relegated after twenty five years in the top flight following two large points deductions during the season.

Stadiums and locations

Table

Fixtures
Fixtures for the season were announced by Premiership Rugby on 29 September 2020 - this was delayed from July due to the previous season being affected by the COVID-19 pandemic lockdown.

The London Double Header no longer features after being discontinued in 2018.

League Season
The league season began on 20 November 2020.

Round 1

Round 2

Round 3

Round 4

Round 5

Round 6

Round 7

Round 8

Round 9

Round 10

Round 11

Round 12

Round 13

Round 14

Round 15

Round 16

Round 17

Round 18

Round 19

Round 20

Round 21

Round 22

Play-offs
As in previous seasons, the top four teams in the Premiership table, following the conclusion of the regular season, contest the play-off semi-finals in a 1st vs 4th and 2nd vs 3rd format, with the higher ranking team having home advantage. The two winners of the semi-finals then meet in the Premiership Final at Twickenham on 26 June 2021.

Bracket

Semi-finals

Final

{| width=100% style="font-size: 90%"
|

Touch judges:
Luke PearceKarl Dickson
Television Match Official:
Ian Tempest

Leading scorers
Note: Flags indicate national union as has been defined under WR eligibility rules. Players may hold more than one non-WR nationality.

Most points

Source:

Most tries

Source:

Notes

References

External links
 

 
2020-21
Premiership Rugby
England